Shellcraft, also known as shell craft, is the craft of making decorative objects, or of decorating surfaces, using seashells. The craft includes the design and creation of small items such as shell jewelry and figurines made from shells; middle-sized objects such as boxes and mirror frames covered in shells; sailor's valentines; and larger constructions including mosaics and shell grottos.

Shellcraft is sometimes simply a folk art which is carried out by amateurs, however, in some parts of the world, including the Philippines, it is a business.

References

 2010 article about shellcraft by Janice Light on the Conchological Society website

Further reading
 Logan, E.D.  1974.  Shell Crafts.  Charles Scribner’s Sons, New York. 214pp.
 Toller, J.  1969.  The Regency and Victorian Crafts or The Genteel Female – Her Arts and Pursuits.  Ward Lock Ltd, London.  96pp.
 Virginia Fowler Elbert, 1993. Shell Craft 288 pp. 

Mollusc products